Friesenplatz is an underground station and hub on the Cologne Stadtbahn lines 3, 4, 5, 12 and 15 in Cologne. The station lies on the Cologne Ring, corner Friesenplatz in the district of Innenstadt.

The station was opened in 1985 and consists of a mezzanine and two platform levels with four side platforms and four rail tracks.

Notable places nearby 
 Hohenzollernring entertainment district
 Gerling Ring-Karree
 Päffgen Brewery, Friesenstraße

See also 
 List of Cologne KVB stations

References

External links 
 
 station info page 
 station layout diagram 

Cologne KVB stations
Innenstadt, Cologne
Railway stations in Germany opened in 1985
Cologne-Bonn Stadtbahn stations
1985 establishments in West Germany